Germen or Germin may refer to:

 Germen, an archaic form of germ, meaning seed

 Xylophanes germen, a species of butterfly in Macroglossinae in Genus Xylophanes
 San Germen F.C., a team in the Club Atlético Independiente de La Chorrera

People with the surname
 Gonzalez Germen (born 1987), Dominican baseball pitcher
 Narcís Germen, a mayor of Girona
 Nur Germen ( 1971–1993), Turkish basketballer, Turkey national basketball team member

People with the given name
 Germen Perry, author of book Albert Camus
 Germun LePig, British drummer of the band the Pork Dukes

See also 
 Garmin, a company that develops technologies for the Global Positioning System
 German (disambiguation)
 Germinal (disambiguation)
 Jermyn (disambiguation)